New Hope Township may refer to:

 New Hope Township, Izard County, Arkansas, in Izard County, Arkansas
 New Hope Township, Union County, Iowa, in Union County, Iowa
 New Hope Township, Chatham County, North Carolina, in Chatham County, North Carolina
 New Hope Township, Iredell County, North Carolina
 New Hope Township, Perquimans County, North Carolina, in Perquimans County, North Carolina
 New Hope Township, Randolph County, North Carolina, in Randolph County, North Carolina
 New Hope Township, Wayne County, North Carolina, in Wayne County, North Carolina

Township name disambiguation pages